Point Harbor is an unincorporated community located in Currituck County, North Carolina, United States. The community is unincorporated but has an estimated permanent population of approximately 100. The community, along with Southern Shores, borders the Wright Memorial Bridge, the only bridge that crosses the Currituck Sound.  Point Harbor is best known for being "America's Home Town."  Also, Point Harbor had a thriving music scene between the years of 1999 and 2007.  Additionally, Point Harbor is home to Cahoon's Hardware, Culligan Water, Headlights OBX strip club (which replaced Mermaids), and Hotdoggers Surf Cafe. Many people
pass through Point Harbor on their way to the Outer Banks.   The ZIP Code for Point Harbor is 27964.

References

Unincorporated communities in North Carolina
Unincorporated communities in Currituck County, North Carolina
Populated coastal places in North Carolina